Matt Irwin (10 February 1980 – 5 May 2016) was a British celebrity photographer.

Matt Irwin was born in Southport, England on 10 February 1980, and started taking photographs aged 15. He moved to London, and worked as an editor and then in-house photographer at the magazine Dazed & Confused, with his first cover shoot first in 2007.

Irwin photographed Lady Gaga, Nicki Minaj, One Direction, Rihanna, Kesha, Rita Ora, Miley Cyrus, and Cara Delevingne, among others.

He died on 5 May 2016 after committing suicide, according to his family. His suicide was later confirmed by the coroner at the inquest following his death. The investigating coroner, Jaqueline Devonish, noted that he had been suffering with depression and disclosed the results of his post-mortem revealing that he had died as a result of an overdose of GHB.

References

1980 births
2016 deaths
Photographers from Lancashire
People from Southport
Drug-related suicides in England